In 1996 in NASCAR, the National Association for Stock Car Auto Racing (NASCAR) sanctioned three national touring series, eight regional touring series, and the Winston Racing Series for local competition. NASCAR champions in 1996 were Terry Labonte, Randy LaJoie, Ron Hornaday Jr., Lance Hooper, Dave Dion, Tony Hirschman, Lyndon Amick, Mike Cope, Kelly Tanner, Chris Raudman, Joe Kosiski, and Larry Phillips.

Off-track activities
During 1996, NASCAR expanded its brand into several new entertainment areas. The NASCAR Online website went live during the year, while the first four NASCAR Thunder stores, operated in conjunction with Gaylord Entertainment, were opened. In addition, the NASCAR Racing Online Series, based on Papyrus's NASCAR Racing 2 game, was formed using the Total Entertainment Network system.

National touring series

Winston Cup Series

The 1996 NASCAR Winston Cup Series consisted of 31 events, run at 18 race tracks in 15 states. Terry Labonte won his second series championship, beating Jeff Gordon by 37 points; the Rick Hendrick-owned No. 5 Kellogg's Corn Flakes Chevrolet team won the series' owner's championship. Labonte's team, led by crew chief Gary DeHart, also won the series' Pit Crew Championship, held in October at North Carolina Motor Speedway.

Eleven drivers won races over the course of the 31-race season; Jeff Gordon won the most events, with ten victories. Bobby Hamilton was the season's only first-time winner, winning at Phoenix International Raceway in October.

The Busch Pole Award was won by Jeff Gordon, who won five pole positions during the season. Johnny Benson Jr. won the series' Rookie of the Year title over Randy MacDonald and Stacy Compton, while Bill Elliott won his eleventh Most Popular Driver award. The series' Manufacturers' Championship was won by Chevrolet, whose teams won 17 of the series' races; Ford won 13 events while Pontiac drivers scored a single win.

In addition to the 31-race regular season, three exhibition races were run during the year. The Busch Clash, an event for the previous year's pole-winning drivers at Daytona International Speedway in February, was won by Dale Jarrett, while The Winston, the series' all-star race for race winners at Charlotte Motor Speedway in May, was won by Michael Waltrip, who had advanced into the event as a wild card from the last chance race for non-winning drivers. Following the regular season, the Winston Cup Series ran the first NASCAR exhibition race in Japan, and the first overseas exhibition race since the 1988 Goodyear NASCAR 500 in Australia, the Suzuka Thunder Special run on November 24 at Suzuka Circuit; competed in by invited drivers from the Winston Cup Series, Busch Series, Craftsman Truck Series and Winston West Series, the event was won by Rusty Wallace.

Top ten drivers standings

Busch Series

The 1996 NASCAR Busch Series consisted of 26 events, run at 20 race tracks in 14 states. Randy LaJoie won his first series championship, beating David Green by 29 points.

Thirteen drivers won races over the course of the 26-race season; Mark Martin won the most events, with six victories. Randy LaJoie, Buckshot Jones, Greg Sacks, Jeff Fuller, and Kevin Lepage were first-time winners during the season.

The series' Busch Pole Award was won by David Green for the third consecutive season, winning four pole positions during the season. Glenn Allen Jr. won the series' Rookie of the Year title over Mike Dillon and Shane Hall, while David Green won the series' Most Popular Driver award. The series' Manufacturers' Championship, the Bill France Performance Cup, was won by Chevrolet.

Top ten drivers standings

Craftsman Truck Series

The 1996 NASCAR Craftsman Truck Series, renamed from the SuperTruck Series presented by Craftsman, consisted of 24 events, run at 23 race tracks in 19 states. Ron Hornaday Jr. won his first series championship, beating Jack Sprague by 53 points.

Seven drivers won races over the course of the 26-race season; Mike Skinner won the most events, with eight victories. Dave Rezendes, Jack Sprague, Rick Carelli, and Mark Martin were first-time winners during the season.

The series' Busch Pole Award was won by Mike Skinner, winning five pole positions during the season. Bryan Reffner won the series' Rookie of the Year title over Doug George and Lance Norick, while Jimmy Hensley won the series' Most Popular Driver award. The series' Manufacturers' Championship was won by Chevrolet, followed by Ford and Dodge.

Top ten drivers standings

Regional touring series

Winston West Series

The 1996 NASCAR Winston West Series consisted of 15 events, run at 11 race tracks in 6 states; two races, at Sears Point Raceway in May and at Phoenix International Raceway in October, were combination events with the Winston Cup Series. Lance Hooper won his first series championship, beating Jeff Krogh by 30 points; Hooper was the first driver to win the championship during his rookie year in the series.

Eight drivers won races over the course of the 15-race season; Hooper won the most events, with four victories, in addition to finishing first among Winston West competitors in the Phoenix combination race; the four overall wins were a series record for a rookie driver.

The series' Busch Pole Award was tied for by Mark Krogh and Butch Gilliland, who each won three pole positions during the season. Hooper won the series' Rookie of the Year title, while Larry Gunselman won the series' Most Popular Driver award. The series' Manufacturers' Championship was won by Chevrolet, followed by Ford, Pontiac, Oldsmobile, and Buick.

Top ten drivers standings

Manufacturer's standings

Busch North Series
The 1996 NASCAR Busch North Series consisted of 21 events, run at 14 race tracks in 8 states; two races, at Daytona International Speedway in February and at Nazareth Speedway in May, were combination events with the Busch Series. Dave Dion won his first series championship, beating Andy Santerre by 116 points.

Eight drivers won races over the course of the 21-race season; Andy Santerre won the most events, with four victories. The series' Busch Pole Award was won by Santerre, who won eight pole positions during the season. Brad Leighton won the series' Rookie of the Year title, while Brandon Butler won the series' Most Popular Driver award.

Top ten drivers standings

Featherlite Modified Tour

The 1996 NASCAR Featherlite Modified Tour consisted of 20 events, run at 11 race tracks in 7 states. Tony Hirschman won the series championship for the second consecutive year, beating Steve Park by 12 points.

Eight drivers won races over the course of the 20-race season; Steve Park won the most events, with five victories; Park also won the series' Busch Pole Award, winning won four pole positions during the season, and the series' Most Popular Driver award.

Top ten drivers standings

Goody's Dash Series

The 1996 NASCAR Goody's Dash Series consisted of 21 events, run at 18 race tracks in 5 states. Lyndon Amick won his first series championship, beating Robert Huffman by 34 points.

Eight drivers won races over the course of the 21-race season; Amick and Will Hobgood tied for winning the most events, with four victories.[42] Hobgood also won the series' Busch Pole Award, winning five pole positions during the season. Jimmy Foster won the series' Rookie of the Year title over Andy Houston and Brian Sockwell, while Andy Houston won the series' Most Popular Driver award.

Top ten drivers standings

Slim Jim All Pro Series

The 1996 NASCAR Slim Jim All Pro Series consisted of 23 events, run at 19 race tracks in 11 states. Mike Cope won his second series championship, beating Toby Porter by 184 points.

Eleven drivers won races over the course of the 21-race season; Toby Porter and Ron Young tied for winning the most events, with four victories each. The series' Busch Pole Award was won by Wayne Anderson, who won five pole positions during the season; Tammy Jo Kirk won two poles, becoming the series' first female pole winner. Steven Christian won the series' Rookie of the Year title over Wayne Anderson and Nipper Alsup, while Tammy Jo Kirk won the series' Most Popular Driver award.

Top ten drivers standings

Reb-Co Northwest Tour

The 1996 NASCAR Reb-Co Northwest Tour consisted of 13 events, run at 7 race tracks in Washington and Oregon. Kelly Tanner won his first series championship, beating Garrett Evans by 156 points.

Eight drivers won races over the course of the 13-race season; Garrett Evans won the most events, scoring four victories. The series' Busch Pole Award was won by Kelly Tanner, who won four pole positions during the season; Marc Groskreutz won the series' Rookie of the Year award.

Top ten drivers standings

Featherlite Southwest Tour

The 1996 NASCAR Featherlite Southwest Tour consisted of 18 events, run at 13 race tracks in 5 states. Chris Raudman won his first series championship, beating Bryan Germone by 160 points.

Twelve drivers won races over the course of the 18-race season; Craig Raudman won the most events, with three victories each. The series' Busch Pole Award was tied for by Chris Raudman, Craig Raudman, and M. K. Kanke, who won three pole positions each; Chris Raudman won the series' Rookie of the Year title as well as the championship. Chris Raudman also won the series' "Winter Heat" exhibition race at Tucson Raceway Park in December.

Top ten drivers standings

Busch All-Star Tour

The only NASCAR regional series to compete on dirt tracks, the 1996 NASCAR Busch All-Star Tour consisted of 16 events, run at 11 race tracks in 5 states. Joe Kosiski won his fourth series championship, beating Ray Guss Jr. by 19 points.

Eight drivers won races over the course of the 18-race season; Joe Kosiski won the most events, with four victories. Donnie McClellan won the series' Rookie of the Year title, while Denny Osborn was named the series' Most Popular Driver.

Top ten drivers standings

Winston Racing Series
The 1996 NASCAR Winston Racing Series was a local racing series operating under NASCAR sanction, comprising 100 member tracks grouped into 10 regions. Each track ran weekly races in a variety of classes, with one class being the track's featured class; each featured class champion at each track was then ranked using a Competition Performance Index (CPI), based on the driver's winning percentage, a weighed car count for the region's tracks, and percentage of races competed in, with the driver having the highest CPI being declared the regional champion. The regional champions' CPIs were then ranked, with the highest-ranking driver being awarded the national championship.

Larry Phillips, competing in the Grand American Late Model class at I-44 Speedway in the Heartland Region, won the series' national championship in 1996, his fifth Winston Racing Series national championship. Second in the national rankings was John Blewett III, competing at Flemington Speedway in the Northeast Region, third was Wes Troup of Old Dominion Speedway in the Atlantic Seaboard Region, fourth was Steven Howard competing at Greenville-Pickens Speedway in the Blue Ridge Region, fifth was Steve Boley from West Liberty Raceway in the Midwest Region, sixth was Bobby Hogge IV competing at Antioch Speedway and Altamont Raceway Park in the Pacific Coast Region, seventh was Eddie McKean of Magic Valley Speedway in the Great West Region, eighth was Mike VanSparrentak from Kalamazoo Speedway in the Mid-America Region, ninth was Carl Trimmer of Tucson Raceway Park in the Sunbelt Region, and tenth was Dale Planck, who competed at Fulton Speedway and Utica-Rome Speedway in the New England Region.

References
Citations

Bibliography

 
NASCAR seasons